The canton of Le Pays de Serres is an administrative division of the Lot-et-Garonne department, southwestern France. It was created at the French canton reorganisation which came into effect in March 2015. Its seat is in Penne-d'Agenais.

It consists of the following communes:
 
Auradou
Beauville
Blaymont
Cassignas
Castella
Cauzac
La Croix-Blanche
Dausse
Dondas
Engayrac
Frespech
Laroque-Timbaut
Massels
Massoulès
Monbalen
Penne-d'Agenais
Saint-Martin-de-Beauville
Saint-Maurin
Saint-Robert
Saint-Sylvestre-sur-Lot
La Sauvetat-de-Savères
Tayrac
Trémons

References

Cantons of Lot-et-Garonne